Muhammad Rafique Banbhan is a Pakistani politician who had been a Member of the Provincial Assembly of Sindh, from May 2013 to May 2018.

Early life 
He was born on 1 May 1960 in Khairpur District.

Political career

He was elected to the Provincial Assembly of Sindh as a candidate of Pakistan Muslim League (F) from Constituency PS-31 KHAIRPUR-III in 2013 Pakistani general election.

He was re-elected to Provincial Assembly of Sindh as a candidate of Grand Democratic Alliance (GDA) from Constituency PS-29 (Khairpur-IV) in 2018 Pakistani general election.

References

Living people
Sindh MPAs 2013–2018
1960 births
Pakistan Muslim League (F) politicians
Grand Democratic Alliance MPAs (Sindh)
Sindh MPAs 2018–2023